LaVarre is a surname. Notable people with the surname include:
André de la Varre (1904–1987), American filmmaker, brother of William LaVarre and John Merton
Mark LaVarre (born 1965), American ice hockey player
William LaVarre (1898–1991), American geographer, explorer and journalist, brother of André de la Varre and John Merton
John Merton (born Myrtland F. LaVarre; 1901–1959), American actor, brother of André de la Varre and William LaVarre